The 2019 BK Häcken season is BK Häcken's 79th season of existence, and its 19th season competing in the Allsvenskan, the top tier of football in Sweden. The club has been a fixture in the Allsvenskan each season since 2009. In addition to the 2019 Allsvenskan, BK Häcken will compete in the Svenska Cupen, and the UEFA Europa League.

Squad

Transfers and loans 
From January 1, 2019.  Arrivals include players returning from loans.  Departures include players out on loan.

Arrivals

Departures

Non-competitive

Pre-season Friendlies

Competitive

Competition record

Allsvenskan

League table

Results by round

Game-by-game review

Svenska Cupen

Initial Rounds

Group stage

Knockout stage

UEFA Europa League

Second qualifying round

Statistics

Appearances 

This includes all competitive matches.

Goalscorers 

This includes all competitive matches.

Assists 

This includes all competitive matches.

Clean Sheets 

This includes all competitive matches.

Disciplinary record 

This includes all competitive matches.

Awards

Team

Individual

References 

 BK Häcken – official site
 Supporterklubben Getingarna – official supporter club site
 Sektion G – supporter site

BK Häcken seasons
Häcken